Boris Alexandrovich Yugai (15 November 1957 - 12 March 2010) was a Kyrgyz Major General and military leader who served as the Chief of the Armed Forces General Staff from March 2007 to June 2008 under President Kurmanbek Bakiyev. Yugai was generally regarded as an important figure in the military, often enjoying strong support among military personnel.

Early life and career 
He was born on 15 November 1957 in Georgievka in the Dzhambul Region of the Kazakh SSR (now Korday, Kazakhstan). Yugai was Korean by ethnicity and was fluent in the Korean language outside of Russian and Kyrgyz. In 1979, he graduated from the Leningrad Higher Artillery Command School, majoring in mathematics. He took part in the Soviet–Afghan War as part of a Soviet Army contingent from 1980 to 1982. Throughout his time in the army, he was mostly based in Ukraine, Uzbekistan, Germany and Turkmenistan.

After the creation of the Armed Forces of the Kyrgyz Republic, he immediately took a commission in the Kyrgyz Army as a platoon commander. As an officer, he took part in the elimination of the militants of the Islamic Movement of Uzbekistan in southern Kyrgyzstan during the Batken Conflict.

From December 2000-October 2002, Yugai, served as the Head of the Main Organization and Mobilization Directorate of the General Staff. During this period, he graduated from academic courses at the Military Academy of the General Staff of the Armed Forces of Russia in 2001. He was appointed Deputy Minister of National Defense on October 2002 and Chief of the General Staff/First Deputy Minister of Defense of Kyrgyzstan on 14 March 2007.  From October 2007, he was also concurrently the Chief of the Joint Staff of the Collective Security Treaty Organization. He served until 24 June 2008 and was replaced by Abibilla Kudayberdiev.

n 2008-2009, he was interrogated in connection with the criminal case of former Defense Minister Ismail Isakov and was accused of abuse of power. In October 2009, the case was dropped.

Death 
He died in Bishkek in March 2010 as a result of a heart attack. Kyrgyz media mostly avoided reporting Yugai’s death despite his regard in the army.

Personal life 
The youngest of three boys, his eldest brother is the dean of a university, and his second brother is a university professor. He also has a younger sister, who is a cardiologist. His wife, Natasha, was also of Korean descent.

Awards
Order "For Service to the Homeland in the Armed Forces of the USSR" 1st and 2nd Degree
Medal "To the Soldier-Internationalist from the Grateful Afghan People"
Order of Friendship
Medal "For Impeccable Service"  1st Degree
Medal "10 years of the Armed Forces of the Kyrgyz Republic"

References 

1957 births
2010 deaths
People from Jambyl Region
Kyrgyzstani generals
Chiefs of the General Staff (Kyrgyzstan)
Military Academy of the General Staff of the Armed Forces of Russia alumni
Soviet military personnel of the Soviet–Afghan War
Kyrgyzstani people of Korean descent
Soviet people of Korean descent
Koryo-saram
Soviet Army officers